Oliver "Rube" Sellers (March 7, 1881 – January 14, 1952) was an outfielder in Major League Baseball. He played for the Boston Doves in 1910.

References

External links

1881 births
1952 deaths
People from Duquesne, Pennsylvania
Major League Baseball outfielders
Boston Doves players
Baseball players from Pennsylvania
Sharon Steels players
Sharon Giants players
McKeesport Tubers players
Akron Champs players
Decatur Commodores players
Danville Speakers players
Pittsburgh Filipinos players